ImHex is a free cross-platform hex editor available on Windows, macOS, and Linux.

ImHex is used by programmers and reverse engineers to view and analyze binary data.

History 

The initial release of the project in November 2020, saw significant interest on GitHub.

Features 

Features include:

 Hex editor
 Custom Pattern matching and analysis Scripting Language
 Visual, node based data pre-processor
 Disassembler
 Running and visualizing of YARA rules
 Bookmarks
 Binary data diffing
 Additional Tools
 MSVC, Itanium, D and Rust name demangler
 ASCII Table
 Calculator
 Base converter
 File utilities
 IEEE 754 floating point decoder
 Division by invariant multiplication calculator

Support for:
 Data importing and exporting
 ASCII string, Unicode string, numeric, hexadecimal and Regular expressions search
 Byte manipulation
 File hashing
 Plug-ins

See also 

 Comparison of hex editors
 Reverse engineering

References

External links 

 

Hex editors
Programming tools